Charles Foxe (by 1516 – December 1590), of Bromfield, Shropshire and the Inner Temple, London, was an English politician.

Family
Foxe was the second of six sons of Ludlow MP, William Foxe. His brother, Edmund Foxe, also represented the constituency. Foxe married Elizabeth Crosby, by whom he had two sons and three daughters. His second marriage was to Catherine Leighton, daughter of Sir Edward Leighton of Shropshire, with whom he had three sons. Foxe also had an illegitimate son by an unknown mother.

Career
He was a Member (MP) of the Parliament of England for Ludlow in 1539, 1542, 1547 and March 1553, and for Much Wenlock in 1563.

References

Year of birth missing
1590 deaths
Members of the Inner Temple
Politicians from Shropshire
English MPs 1539–1540
English MPs 1542–1544
English MPs 1547–1552
English MPs 1553 (Edward VI)
English MPs 1563–1567
16th-century births